A Woman's Revenge is a 1990 French drama film directed by Jacques Doillon and starring Isabelle Huppert. It was entered into the 40th Berlin International Film Festival.

Cast
 Isabelle Huppert as Cécile
 Béatrice Dalle as Suzy
 Jean-Louis Murat as Stéphane
 Laurence Côte as Laurence
 Sebastian Roché as Le dealer
 David Léotard as Le jeune homme
 Albert Le Prince as Le médecin (as Albert Leprince)
 Brigitte Marvine as La danseuse
 Pierre Amzallag as Le voisin
 Jean-Pierre Bamberger as La présence

See also
 Isabelle Huppert on screen and stage

References

External links

1990 films
French drama films
1990s French-language films
1990 drama films
Films based on works by Fyodor Dostoyevsky
Films directed by Jacques Doillon
1990s French films